is a life simulation video game released for the Family Computer.

Gameplay

The player plays as a bird and can either play the normal game or the single level practice game. The player must feed butterflies to the baby birds so that they can grow big and eventually leave the nest. It is suggested that they eventually become the "new mother birds" that take care of their offspring in the subsequent levels. Finishing all 999 levels of Bird Week actually results in the beginning of an endless loop that only ends when the players loses all of his lives.

Each level represents a season in the ecosystem of a bird. The game starts out in early spring. As the virtual year progresses, the season evolves into summer and eventually into autumn. After autumn, the game repeats itself by portraying the following spring. If the proper number of butterflies are not fed to the babies, then the babies end up starving to death, becoming unconscious. The player will automatically lose a life if any of the baby birds die. In addition to this, the player also loses a life when a predator catches the player trying to deliver butterflies to a baby.

Legacy
In 2010, Healthy Option Dane, a jazz-influenced band from Burlington, Vermont, released a Bird Week-themed live performance music video. Footage from the game is included in the video.

References

External links
 Bird Week promotional flyer at Giant Bomb
  Bird Week Music Video - Healthy Option Dane's "Bird Week" Music Video

1986 video games
Biological simulation video games
Japan-exclusive video games
Nintendo Entertainment System games
Nintendo Entertainment System-only games
Platform games
Single-player video games
Toshiba EMI games
Video games about birds
Video games developed in Japan
Video games featuring female protagonists